Bradley Kruger (born 17 September 1988 in Pretoria, South Africa) is a Netherlands cricketer.

2011 World Cup
Kruger was part of the squad at the World Cup held in India, Sri Lanka and Bangladesh from 19 February to 2 April 2011.

References

1988 births
Living people
Netherlands One Day International cricketers
Dutch cricketers
Cricketers at the 2011 Cricket World Cup
Cricketers from Pretoria